The 1st Czechoslovak Mixed Air Division was the air arm of the Czechoslovak armed forces in the Soviet Union during World War II, operating under the operational command of the Soviet Air Force. It existed during 1944 and 1945, being merged into the Czechoslovak Air Force upon the cessation of hostilities.

Aircraft
 Ilyushin Il-2
 Lavochkin La-5
 Lavochkin La-7
 Polikarpov Po-2

References

Air divisions of World War II
Military units and formations of Czechoslovakia in World War II
Units and formations of the Soviet Air Forces
Czechoslovakia–Soviet Union relations